Ahmed Imtiaz Bulbul (1956–2019) was a Bangladeshi music director and lyricist. He composed for 195 films in his career, the most among all Bangladeshi composers, followed by Alam Khan (196). The following is a list of films he scored and wrote lyrics for:

1970s

1980s

1990s

2000s

2010s

2020s

Year unknown

Background score only

Non-film albums

Songs for television

As lyricist

References

Sources
 

Discographies of Bangladeshi artists